Land is the eleventh studio album by Japanese pop rock duo Yuzu, released through Senha & Co on May 1, 2013 after 2011 Tōhoku earthquake. Some songs of the album encourage people to overcome the disaster. The album debuted at number one on both Oricon's and Billboard Japan's weekly album rankings, with 89,334 copies sold in its first week. It is certified Gold by the Recording Industry Association of Japan for sales of 100,000. Land was ranked number 33 on Billboard Japan's Top 100 Albums of 2013. It won the Japan Record Awards for Best Album in 2013.

Singles

Yuzu released singles from Land for over a year, including "Love & Peach", "Sho", "With You", "See You Tomorrow", "Reason", and "Black Bird". The single "Reason" and another song of the album, "Nagareboshi Kirari" (流れ星キラリ Shooting Star), were used as ending themes for the 2011 anime Hunter × Hunter. "Reason" was ranked number two on the Billboard Japan Hot 100, and received a digital download song certification of Gold from the RIAJ for sales of 100,000.

Track listing

Charts

Weekly charts

Year-end charts

Certifications

Awards

References

External links
 

2013 albums
Yuzu (band) albums
Japanese-language albums